Elections in Northern Cyprus are organized to elect governments, presidents and representatives of local administrative bodies in Northern Cyprus, known as the Turkish Republic of Northern Cyprus.

Electoral system
The presidency, which is served in five-year terms, was instituted with TRNC's first presidential election in 1985 and continued with the elections of 1990, 1995, 2000 and 2005,2010 with the next election scheduled for April 2015. The legislature, Cumhuriyet Meclisi (Assembly of the Republic of Northern Cyprus), has 50 members, elected for a five-year term by mitigated proportional representation. The territory has a multi-party system, with two or three strong parties and another party which is also electorally successful.

In the presidential election, a candidate must obtain at least 50% of the votes in order to secure a first-ballot victory. Upon failing to do so, the two top candidates compete in a runoff election, with the winner assuming the presidency.

The mitigated proportional representation system in use for legislative elections obligates each party to cross the 5% of the total vote election threshold in order to be seated in the 50-member parliament, which is chosen from five districts: Lefkoşa, Gazimağusa, Girne, Güzelyurt and İskele.

In the parliamentary elections, voters choose individual candidates with two options in the manner of voting: a party-line vote which, in effect, means a vote for each candidate from that party in that election district or, alternatively, the voter may choose different MP candidates from various parties. In this type of mixed voting, the voter may not choose more than the number of MPs from that district.

Residents of Northern Cyprus are eligible to stand for election and vote in the national elections of the Republic of Cyprus, but not able to run for presidency (the Constitution states that a Turkish-Cypriot should be Vice-President of the Republic). Turkish Cypriot communal representation in the Republic of Cyprus government de facto ended in 1963. Until 2004, the case of Ibrahim Aziz in the European Court of Human Rights, Turkish Cypriots could not vote in the Republic of Cyprus.

Latest elections

2020 Northern Cypriot presidential election

2022 Northern Cypriot parliamentary election

Presidential elections

Parliamentary elections

In 2009 President Mehmet Ali Talat claimed that in 1990 and 1998 Turkish government officials along with other influential powers from Turkey interfered with the Parliamentary Elections.

References

 
Politics of Northern Cyprus